Pliny Bingham represented Dedham, Massachusetts in the Great and General Court. A swamp he owned submerged the Dedham Branch of the Boston and Providence Railroad during construction. He stole the silver from the First Church and Parish in Dedham during a dispute that split the church.

References

Works cited

Members of the Massachusetts General Court
Year of birth missing
Year of death missing